James Garson is an American philosopher and logician. He has made significant contributions in the study of modal logic and formal semantics. He is author of Modal Logic for Philosophers and What Logics Mean by Cambridge University Press. Garson is Professor of Philosophy at the University of Houston and has taught at the University of Pennsylvania, the University of Notre Dame, the University of Illinois at Chicago (where he was a visiting professor in computer science), and Rice University.

References 

20th-century American philosophers
21st-century American philosophers
Analytic philosophers
American logicians
Haverford College alumni
University of Pittsburgh alumni
Living people
University of Houston faculty
University of Pennsylvania faculty
University of Illinois Chicago faculty
Rice University faculty
Year of birth missing (living people)